Carl Koch or Karl Koch (30 July 1892 in Nümbrecht, Germany – 1 December 1963 in Barnet, England) was a German art historian, film director and writer with many secondary credits including collaborations with his wife Lotte Reiniger, the animator of The Adventures of Prince Achmed (1926). In these collaborations, Koch often managed the camera work, which was mounted above Reiniger's animation table.

Koch was an art historian, and before he met Reiniger, he made films for museums about art history and other educational matters. 

Other than his work with Reiniger, Koch is perhaps best known as assistant to Jean Renoir, who helped get Koch and Reiniger exit visas from Germany in 1936. Koch and Renoir, during the filming of La Grande Illusion (in which Koch has an uncredited role), discovered that Koch's artillery unit had actually fired on Renoir's airplane during World War I. 

In 1939, Koch and Renoir began an adaptation of Tosca at Mussolini's invitation. The French government urged Renoir to take the project as a way to keep Italy on their side as the war escalated, but Renoir had to abandon this project when Italy entered the war against France. Koch completed the film as "Carlo Koch", with Luchino Visconti as his assistant.

After the war, in 1949, Koch moved with his wife to England where they settled in an artists' community called the Abbey Arts Centre in New Barnet. Together, they made 13 silhouette films for television and many others for various other producers in these later years.

Filmography 

1919 Das Ornament des verliebten Herzens, other
1920/1921 Der fliegende Koffer, camera
1920 Amor und das standhafte Liebespaar, camera
1921 Der Stern von Bethlehem, camera
1921/1922 Das Geheimnis der Marquise, other
1922 Dornröschen, camera
1922/1923 Aschenputtel, camera
1922–1924 Kind und Welt: Das Großstadtkind und die Gartenarbeitsschule, writer, director
1923–1926 Die Abenteuer des Prinzen Achmed, cinematography, director (uncredited)
1924 Die Barcarole, other
1927 Der scheintote Chinese, other
1926/1928 Ägyptische Reise. Eine Expedition durch das älteste Land der Welt, writer, director, produce, camera
1928 Der scheintote Chinese [second version?], other
1928 Doktor Dolittle und seine Tiere [1-part version], cinematography
1928 Doktor Dolittle und seine Tiere. (originally with music by Paul Dessau, Kurt Weill and Paul Hindemith), cinematography
1. Abenteuer: Die Reise nach Afrika
2. Abenteuer: Die Affenbrücke
3. Abenteuer: Die Affenkrankheit
1929 Der Tod (aka Totentanz, from Brecht's The Baden-Baden Lesson on Consent), director
 Chasing Fortune (1930), writer, assistant director, producer
1930 Zehn Minuten Mozart, cinematography
1931/1932 Harlekin, other
1931/1932 Nippon, director
1932 Sissi, other
1933/1934 Das rollende Rad, other
1934 Das gestohlene Herz, other
1934 Das rollende Rad. Ein Film von Wagen und Straßen, writer
1934 Der Graf von Carabas, other
1934/1935 Der kleine Schornsteinfeger, other
1935 Papageno, other
1935 Galathea, producer
La Marseillaise (1938) screenplay
La Règle du jeu (1939) assistant director
 Cristobal's Gold (1940)
Tosca (1941) begun by Renoir
 Girl of the Golden West (1942)
Night of the Silvery Moon (1954)

References

External links
Filmography, filmportal.de

Exhibit of still photos by Koch from The Threepenny Opera directed by his wife Lotte Reiniger 
Article on Reiniger & Koch by William Moritz

1892 births
1963 deaths
Film people from North Rhine-Westphalia
People from Oberbergischer Kreis
German emigrants to the United Kingdom